USS Reuben James (DD-245) was a four-funnel  made after World War I that was the first US Navy ship to be named for Boatswain's Mate Reuben James (circa 1776–1838), who had distinguished himself fighting in the First Barbary War, and was the first to be sunk by hostile action in the European Theater of World War II. Reuben James was laid down on 2 April 1919 by the New York Shipbuilding Corporation of Camden, New Jersey, launched on 4 October 1919, and commissioned on 24 September 1920. The destroyer was sunk by a torpedo attack from German submarine  near Iceland on 31 October 1941, before the United States had officially joined the war.

Early service history
Assigned to the US Atlantic Fleet, Reuben James was used in the Mediterranean Sea from 1921 to 1922 after she had gone from Newport, Rhode Island, on 30 November 1920, to Zelenika, Yugoslavia, and arrived on 18 December. During the spring and the summer of 1921, she operated in the Adriatic Sea and the Mediterranean out of Zelenika and Gruz (Dubrovnik), Yugoslavia and assisted refugees and participated in postwar investigations. In October 1921 at Le Havre, she joined the protected cruiser  at ceremonies marking the return of the Unknown Soldier to the US. At Danzig, from 29 October 1921 to 3 February 1922, she assisted the American Relief Administration in its efforts to relieve hunger and misery. After duty in the Mediterranean, she departed Gibraltar on 17 July.

Then based at New York City, she patrolled the coast of Nicaragua to prevent the delivery of weapons to revolutionaries in early 1926. During the spring of 1929, she participated in fleet maneuvers that helped develop naval airpower. She was decommissioned at Philadelphia on 20 January 1931. Recommissioned on 9 March 1932, she again operated in the Atlantic Ocean and the Caribbean Sea by patrolling Cuban waters during the coup by Fulgencio Batista. She transferred to San Diego in 1934. After maneuvers that evaluated aircraft carriers, she returned to the Atlantic Fleet in January 1939.

World War II

Upon the beginning of World War II in Europe in September 1939, she was assigned to the Neutrality Patrol, which guarded the Atlantic and the Caribbean approaches to the American coast. In March 1941, Reuben James joined the force established to escort convoys sailing to Great Britain. The force escorted convoys as far as Iceland after which the convoys became the responsibility of British escorts. The force was based at Hvalfjordur, Iceland, and commanded by Lieutenant Commander Heywood Lane Edwards, the commander of the USS Reuen James.

On 23 October she sailed from Naval Station Argentia, Newfoundland, with four other destroyers, escorting eastbound Convoy HX 156.

Sinking
At dawn on 31 October, she was torpedoed near Iceland by German submarine  commanded by Kapitänleutnant Erich Topp. Reuben James had positioned herself between an ammunition ship in the convoy and the known position of a German "wolfpack," a group of submarines poised to attack the convoy. The destroyer was not flying the ensign of the United States and was in the process of dropping depth charges on another U-boat when she was engaged. Reuben James was hit forward by a torpedo meant for a merchant ship and her entire bow was blown off when a magazine exploded. The bow sank immediately. The aft section floated for five minutes before going down. Of a crew of seven officers and 136 enlisted men, plus one enlisted passenger, 100 were killed. That left only 44 enlisted men and no officers who survived the attack.

Convoys escorted

Awards
Second Nicaraguan Campaign Medal
American Defense Service Medal with "FLEET" clasp and "A" device

In popular culture

Music
 Woody Guthrie wrote the song "The Sinking of the Reuben James" and performed it with Pete Seeger and the other Almanac Singers. The Guthrie song has an original tune for its chorus, but its verses are set to the tune of the song "Wildwood Flower." Seeger later also performed the song with The Weavers.
 Johnny Horton performed Guthrie's song on his album Johnny Horton Makes History.
 The Kingston Trio released a version of Guthrie's song on numerous albums.
 The Chad Mitchell Trio released a version of Guthrie's song on the album Reflecting.

Television
 In Foyle's War, Series 4, Episode 1, "Invasion," Captain John Kieffer confides in Christopher Foyle that he never understood the American isolationists who opposed the war. John enlisted in the US military the day after his 25-year-old kid brother, Brian, was killed while serving on a Navy destroyer on convoy duty a month before the bombing of Pearl Harbor. Brian and 114 other people lost their lives when a German U-boat torpedoed and sank Reuben James in the Atlantic Ocean, a tragedy that nobody mentioned.

Stamps
 The United States Postal Service issued a commemorative stamp in 1991 as part of the set WWII, 1941: A World at War.

Films
 In The Hunt for Red October, the namesake of the ship has a 3" round fired at  Red October in an effort to convince the abandoning crew.

See also
 
 
 USS Panay incident

Notes

References
 
 
 Survivor Tells of Reuben James Sinking at Sea. St. Petersburg Times: St Petersburg, Florida. 25 November 1941.
 44 Members of Crew Saved off of Sunken U.S. Destroyer. The Evening Citizen: Ottawa, Ontario. 1 November 1941.
 Reuben James Hit in Atlantic Convoy Battle. The Milwaukee Journal: Milwaukee. 31 October 1941.

External links
 National Archives site with photo
 
 Location of the sinking of the Reuben James on uboat.net

Clemson-class destroyers
Ships sunk by German submarines in World War II
Reuben James (DD-245)
Ships built by New York Shipbuilding Corporation
World War II shipwrecks in the Atlantic Ocean
1919 ships
Maritime incidents in October 1941
Naval magazine explosions